This is a list of issue covers of TV Guide magazine from the decade of the 1970s, from January 1970 to December 1979. The entries on this table include each cover's subjects and their artists (photographer or illustrator). This list is for the regular weekly issues of TV Guide; any one-time-only special issues are not included.

1970

1971

1972

1973

1979

Sources
Covers and table of contents page descriptions for the various issues.
TV Guide cover archive: 1970s (is without the descriptions it seems)
TV Guide: Fifty Years of Television, New York, NY: Crown Publishers, 2002. 
Stephen Hofer, ed., TV Guide: The Official Collectors Guide, Braintree, Mass.: BangZoom Publishers, 2006.  .
"50 Greatest TV Guide Covers," article from the June 15, 2002 edition of TV Guide
Information from ellwanger.tv's TV Guide collection section

Covers
1970s television-related lists
1970s in American television
TV Guide